Giuseppe Murnigotti (Martinengo,1834 – 1903) was an Italian inventor of the motorcycle. He died in Nice, France.

Over the course of his life, Murnigotti filed patent applications for five inventions. Of these, the third, filed in 1879, described the design of a motorcycle running on gaseous combustion (suggesting the use of hydrogen) and a tricycle with the same engine and the ability to carry two passengers. Murnigotti never built a prototype, but a model can be found in the Museum of Science and Technology in Milan.

Works

 
 

1834 births
1903 deaths
19th-century Italian inventors